Robert Atkinson may refer to:

Rob Atkinson (born 1987), English professional footballer 
Robert Atkinson (footballer, born 1998), English professional footballer
Rob Atkinson (surgeon) (born 1947), Australian orthopaedic surgeon
Robert d'Escourt Atkinson (1898–1982), British astronomer
Robert Atkinson (architect) (1883–1952), English Art Deco architect
Robert Atkinson (philologist) (1839–1908), English scholar
Bob Atkinson (police officer), Commissioner of the Queensland Police Service
Robert D. Atkinson (born 1954), American economist
R. Frank Atkinson (1869–1923), British architect 
Bob Atkinson (footballer, born 1913) (1913–2006), Australian rules footballer
Bob Atkinson (footballer, born 1930) (1930–2017), Australian rules footballer
Robert Atkinson (businessman) (1916–2015), British businessman and Royal Navy officer
J. Robert Atkinson (1887–1964), founder of the Universal Braille Press in 1919
Robert Jones Atkinson (1820–1871), American politician from the state of Ohio
Robert P. Atkinson (1927–2012), bishop in the Episcopal Church
Robert Atkinson (MP), Member of Parliament for Appleby